James Caldwell Grundy Jr. (March 22, 1923 – May 2, 2020) was an American politician and businessman.

Grundy was born in Lebanon, Kentucky. He went to the Lebanon public schools and to University of Kentucky. Grundy was involved in business in Marion County, Kentucky. Grundy served in the Kentucky House of Representatives from 1956 to 1958 and was involved with the Republican Party, chairing the Marion County Republican Committee from 1960 to 1970. He died in Lebanon, Kentucky on May 2, 2020.

Notes

1923 births
2020 deaths
People from Lebanon, Kentucky
Businesspeople from Kentucky
University of Kentucky alumni
Republican Party members of the Kentucky House of Representatives